This is a list of translations of modern literature into dead languages. There is a separate list of such translations into Latin.

Modern literature

Comic books

See also
List of Latin translations of modern literature

References

Modern literature
Extinct languages